Gasconsia is a genus of (aragonitic) Trimerellid brachiopod.

References 

Craniata